Tallorbis is a genus of sea snails, marine gastropod mollusks in the family Chilodontaidae.

Description
The shell is suborbiculate and subconic. The solid columella is anteriorly applanate, transversely plicate and abruptly terminated.

Species
The only species within the genus Tallorbis is:
 Tallorbis roseola G. Nevill & H. Nevill, 1869

References

External links
 To World Register of Marine Species

 
Chilodontaidae
Monotypic gastropod genera